Berkeley Preparatory School is a Pre-K to Grade 12 independent, college-preparatory day school affiliated to the Episcopal Church located in Tampa, Florida, in the United States. On this 86-acre campus some of the notable features include: a 75,000 square foot building for Arts and Sciences, athletic facilities composing of 53,000 square feet, 11,000 square foot Cafe, and 19,000 square foot student center. The library makes available to the students 20,000 titles and over 40 databases. It has either approval or accreditation from the College Board, the Florida Council of Independent Schools, the Florida Department of Education, the National Association of Episcopal Schools and the Southern Association of Independent Schools.

Alumni 
 Nelson Agholor, NFL wide receiver for the New England Patriots
 Martin Baron, journalist and editor of The Washington Post and The Boston Globe
 Declan Farmer, paralympic gold medalist and ESPY winner
 Arjun Gupta, actor on The Magicians
 Kirstjen Nielsen, United States Secretary of Homeland Security
 Maulik Pancholy, actor, voice of Baljeet on Phineas and Ferb
 Nicholas Petit-Frere, NFL offensive lineman for the Tennessee Titans
 Steve Swindal, businessman
 Justin Vogel, NFL football player
 Kyle Dagostino, USA Men's Volleyball team

References

High schools in Tampa, Florida
Educational institutions established in 1960
Private high schools in Florida
Private middle schools in Florida
Private elementary schools in Florida
1960 establishments in Florida
Episcopal schools in the United States